Hare Rama Hare Krishna is a 2011 Indian Kannada-language film directed by C. V. Ashok Kumar, starring Sri Murali and Pooja Gandhi.

Plot

An unemployed guy, Anand bribes an official for a job, but when he doesn't get that job, Anand approaches the higher authority demanding the return of the money he paid. The officials frame him and put him behind the bar.

Cast

Sri Murali
Pooja Gandhi
Achyuth Kumar
Nakshatra
Padma Vasanthi
Siddaraja Kalyankar
Kote Prabhakar
Ravi nayak

Music

Reception

Critical response 

A critic from Bangalore Mirror wrote,  "Then Ashok Kumar takes the film to a moralistic - cinematic heights by saying that all that was shown in the film never happened and Murali did not take up the 'job' of a rowdy. It was only a dream". B S Srivani from Deccan Herald wrote "But the second half, trudging on expected track kicks up a frantic pace. But that is until the audience realises that it has been had. A smart move from the director, but in a lost cause". A critic from News18 India wrote "Veteran actors Achyuth Kumar, Siddaraj Kalyan Kumar, Kari Subbu, Mico Nagaraj, Padmavasanthi have done a decent job, but it has not helped the film in any way. The film is bad enough to keep the audience out of the theaters. Avoid it".

References

External links
 

2011 films
Films scored by Ilaiyaraaja
2010s Kannada-language films